New London Township may refer to the following places in the United States:

New London Township, Henry County, Iowa
New London Township, Kandiyohi County, Minnesota
New London Township, Huron County, Ohio
New London Township, Chester County, Pennsylvania

See also 
 London Township (disambiguation)
 New London (disambiguation)

Township name disambiguation pages